al-Burj, also spelled Borj, is a village in northern Aleppo Governorate, northwestern Syria. On 7 November 2016, Al Burj was captured by the Syrian National Army from ISIS.

Administratively the village belongs to Nahiya al-Bab in al-Bab District. Nearby localities include Tall Battal  to the south, and Ka'ibah  to the northwest, on the Queiq Plain. In the 2004 census, al-Burj had a population of 236.

References

Populated places in al-Bab District